Anna Kristina Kallin-Häggblom (born 6 December 1953 in Umeå, dead 25 August 2004 in Gothenburg (aged 50) (due to illness)) was a Swedish singer and actor. She appeared in many plays at Backa Theatre, among them Aniara, Spöket på Canterville, Eliza and Girl Power.

References

Swedish stage actresses
2004 deaths
1953 births
People from Umeå
20th-century Swedish women singers